John Finglow or Fingley (died 8 August 1586) was an English Roman Catholic priest. He is a Catholic martyr, beatified in 1987.

Life

Born at Barnby, near Howden, Yorkshire, John Finglow was matriculated sizar from Caius College, Cambridge in December 1573. He arrived at the English College at Reims on 9 February 1580 and was ordained priest 25 March 1581. On 24 April, The following month he was sent on the English mission.

He worked for about five years in the north of England before being arrested and confined in Ousebridge Kidcote, York. He was tried for being a Catholic priest and reconciling English subjects to the Catholic Church, and was condemned to be hanged, drawn, and quartered.

See also
 Eighty-five martyrs of England and Wales

References

Sources
Thompson Cooper, ‘Finglow, John (d. 1586/7)’, rev. Sarah Elizabeth Wall, Oxford Dictionary of National Biography, Oxford University Press, 2004. Retrieved 7 September 2008

Further reading
 Burton, Edwin H., "Venerable John Finglow", Lives of the English Martyrs, (Edwin H. Burton and J. H. Pollen eds.), London. Longmans, Green and Co., 1914

1586 deaths
16th-century English Roman Catholic priests
English beatified people
People executed under Elizabeth I by hanging, drawing and quartering
16th-century venerated Christians
Year of birth unknown
Executed people from North Yorkshire
People from the Borough of Scarborough
Eighty-five martyrs of England and Wales